Mautodontha is a genus of small air-breathing land snails, terrestrial pulmonate gastropod mollusks in the family Charopidae.

Species
Species within the genus Mautodontha include:
 Mautodontha acuticosta
 Mautodontha boraborensis
 Mautodontha ceuthma
 Mautodontha consimilis
 Mautodontha consobrina
 Mautodontha maupiensis
 Mautodontha parvidens
 Mautodontha punctiperforata
 Mautodontha saintjohni
 Mautodontha subtilis
 Mautodontha unilamellata
 Mautodontha zebrina

References

 Nomenclator Zoologicus info

 
Charopidae
Taxonomy articles created by Polbot